Alayna Lutkovskaya (born 15 March 1996) is a Russian pole vaulter. She won gold medals at the 2014 World Junior Championships and at the 2013 European Junior Championships. Lutkovskaya also claimed the silver medal at the 2013 World Youth Championships.

In her senior debut at the 2014 European Championships, she finished seventh.

Career
In February 2014, Lutkovskaya broke the Russian junior indoor record when she jumped 4.50 m. The previous record was 4.47 m, set by Yelena Isinbayeva back in 2001. At the 2014 World Junior Championships, she jumped 4.50 m which equalled the World Junior Championships record set by Angelica Bengtsson in Barcelona in 2012. At the same time Lutkovskaya also equalled the Russian junior outdoor record set by Valeriya Volik in 2008.

In September 2014, European Athletics announced that their panel of experts had judged the Europeans who should be the nominees for the Golden Tracks awarded to the European male and female Rising Stars of the Year. Alayna Lutkovskaya was one of the nominees alongside the likes of Mariya Kuchina and Katarina Johnson-Thompson. Most well known male nominees were Adam Gemili and Wilhem Belocian. At the end it was Kuchina and Gemili who were named Rising Stars at the Golden Tracks ceremony in Baku.

In February 2015, Lutkovskaya broke her own Russian junior indoor record when she jumped 4.54 m. On 21 May, she broke World junior record when she jumped 4.61 m. The earlier record was set only one day earlier when Robeilys Peinado had jumped 4.60 m. Lutkovskaya's jump of 4.61 m was the 3rd time in 2015 season when the previous World junior outdoor record of 4.58 m set by Angelica Bengtsson in 2012 was broken because also Nina Kennedy had broken the previous record when she jumped 4.59 m in February 2015. However, Lutkovskaya's jump of 4.61 m was only World junior outdoor record because Bengtsson had jumped 4.63 m indoors and that was also officially World junior record.

Lutkovskaya has personal bests of  outdoors and  indoors. She was born in Irkutsk.

Achievements

References

European Athletics profile

External links

1996 births
Living people
Russian female pole vaulters
Sportspeople from Irkutsk
Authorised Neutral Athletes at the World Athletics Championships